Lemvo Jean Abou Bakar Depara, known as Depara (1928–1997), was an Angolan-born photographer who worked in the Democratic Republic of Congo.

Depara purchased his first video camera to record his wedding in 1950; four years later, he was made official photographer to the Zairian singer Franco.  In 1975 he became official photographer to the National Assembly of Democratic Republic of Congo.  He also took many photographs of the social scene of Kinshasa during the period.  At his death in 1997 he left a large archive of untitled negatives; many of these have been reprinted and titled for sale since his death.

Some of Depara's work is in the collection of Jean Pigozzi.

References
 Bio from the National Museum of African Art

1928 births
1997 deaths
Democratic Republic of the Congo photographers
Angolan emigrants to the Democratic Republic of the Congo
20th-century photographers
20th-century male artists